Comitas declivis is an extinct species of sea snail, a marine gastropod mollusc in the family Pseudomelatomidae.

Description
The length of the shell attains 19 mm, its diameter 6.3 mm.

Distribution
This marine species is endemic to New Zealand. Fossils have been in Lower Pliocene strata (Waitotaran) near the mouth of the Waihi stream, Hāwera.

References

 Powell, Arthur William Baden. "Waitotaran faunules of the Wanganui System and descriptions of new species of Mollusca from the New Zealand Pliocene." Records of the Auckland Institute and Museum 1.2 (1931): 85-112.
 Maxwell, P.A. (2009). Cenozoic Mollusca. pp 232–254 in Gordon, D.P. (ed.) New Zealand inventory of biodiversity. Volume one. Kingdom Animalia: Radiata, Lophotrochozoa, Deuterostomia. Canterbury University Press, Christchurch

External links
 Auckland Museum: Comitas declivis (holotype)

declivis
Gastropods described in 1931
Gastropods of New Zealand